The following television stations in the United States brand as channel 21 (though neither using virtual channel 21 nor broadcasting on physical RF channel 21):

21 branded